Gloska may refer to:

Głoska, Lower Silesian Voivodeship, a village in Poland
Gloška planina, a mountain in Serbia

See also
Zecharia Glosca (died 1960), Yemenite Jew and Israeli politician